Kuckaraukia is a genus of enigmatic Ediacaran organisms known from fossil casts of a disc-shaped biogenic structure interpreted as bifoliate, with a structured bottom layer and a less resistant top layer. It is unknown if the fossils represent single animals or a colonial organism of some kind.

References

Ediacaran
Organisms
Fossils